The Robert T. Matsui United States Courthouse is home to the Sacramento Division of the United States District Court for the Eastern District of California.  It is located at 500 I Street, Sacramento, CA. The building is named for the late congressman Bob Matsui.

Notes

Courthouses in California
Federal courthouses in the United States
Skyscraper office buildings in Sacramento, California